James Howard Weaver (August 8, 1927 – October 6, 2020) was an American businessman, politician, and World War II veteran who served as a Democrat in the United States Congress, representing Oregon's 4th congressional district from 1975 to 1987.

He was known as an advocate for environmental protections, especially those relating to Oregon and the Pacific Northwest region.

Early life and education
Weaver was born in Brookings, South Dakota, the son of Leo C. and Alice (Flittie) Weaver. He enlisted in the United States Navy at the age of seventeen and served in World War II on an aircraft carrier in the Pacific. Weaver moved to Oregon from Des Moines, Iowa, in 1947 to attend the University of Oregon. He graduated with a Bachelor of Science degree in 1952.

Career 
Prior to entering Congress, Weaver worked for a publishing company. In 1959, he was hired as a staff member for the Oregon Department of Agriculture. In 1960, Weaver was hired by a real estate development company, eventually becoming a developer of apartment and office buildings. He was a delegate to the 1960 and 1964 Democratic National Conventions.

In 1974, Weaver defeated incumbent Republican congressman John R. Dellenback to become the United States representative from Oregon's 4th congressional district. He was known for conducting the only filibuster in the modern history of the House of Representatives by adding 113 amendments to a Washington Public Power Supply System bill in 1980. After the filibuster, the House passed "The Weaver Rule" to "limit" the use of such tactics.

In 1986, Weaver was selected as the Democratic nominee for United States Senate and was to face incumbent Republican Bob Packwood. After receiving the nomination, however, Weaver was the subject of a House Ethics Committee probe into his campaign finances, and withdrew his candidacy when it became apparent that he would lose the general election. Oregon State Representative Rick Bauman was selected to replace Weaver on the ballot, and lost to Packwood. The House Ethics Committee ruled that Weaver had used campaign money for personal investments, in violation of House rules. Eventually it was discovered that the report had included errors. The House Ethics Committee later stated that Weaver had not violated the law. Weaver served out his term and was succeeded by his aide, Peter DeFazio.

Legacy
In 2008, a trail around Oregon's Waldo Lake was renamed as the "Jim Weaver Loop Trail" in honor of Weaver.

Weaver died in Eugene on October 6, 2020, at the age of 93.

References

Further reading

External links

1927 births
2020 deaths
University of Oregon alumni
United States Navy sailors
United States Navy personnel of World War II
Politicians from Eugene, Oregon
Politicians from Des Moines, Iowa
People from Brookings, South Dakota
Military personnel from South Dakota
Candidates in the 1986 United States elections
Democratic Party members of the United States House of Representatives from Oregon